Jamuria Union is a union of Ghatail Upazila, Tangail District, Bangladesh.

Demographics
According to the 2011 Bangladesh census, Jamuria Union had 7,463 households and a population of 29,556. The literacy rate (age 7 and over) was 50.4% (male: 53.7%, female: 47.3%).

See also
 Union Councils of Tangail District

References

Populated places in Tangail District
Unions of Ghatail Upazila